Mount Barnard is located on the border of Alberta and British Columbia, NW of the head of Waitabit Creek and North of Golden. It is the 30th highest peak in Alberta and the 42nd highest peak in British Columbia. It was named in 1917 by boundary surveyors after Sir Francis Stillman Barnard, a Lieutenant Governor of BC during the 1910s. It should not be confused with the higher Californian peak of the same name.

See also
 List of peaks on the British Columbia–Alberta border
 List of mountains in the Canadian Rockies

References

Three-thousanders of Alberta
Three-thousanders of British Columbia
Canadian Rockies
Mountains of Banff National Park